The mountain cottontail or Nuttall's cottontail (Sylvilagus nuttallii) is a species of mammal in the family Leporidae. It is found in Canada and the United States.

Description 

The mountain cottontail is a small rabbit but its size is relatively large for the genus. Hind legs are long; the feet are densely covered with long hair. Ears are relatively short and rounded at the tips; the inner surfaces are noticeably haired. It has pale brown fur on the back, a distinct pale brown nape on the back of the head, black-tipped ears, a white-grey tail, and a white underside. The brown nape on the back of the head is a smaller size from than that of the Snowshoe Hare, helping to distinguish the two separate species from each other. Additionally, contrasting with the Snowshoe Hare’s long hops, the mountain cottontails take short distinctive leaps.

Range 
This species is generally confined to the intermountain area of North America, especially the Western United States. It ranges from just above the Canada–US border south to Arizona and New Mexico, and from the foothills of the eastern slopes of the Rocky Mountains and west to the eastern slopes of the Cascade-Sierra Nevada.  It has a large east to west range from the state of South Dakota to California. Additionally, three subspecies exist under the S. nuttallii and they tend to remain separate in geographical terms. Aside from geographical confinement, the mountain cottontail survives in a large range of elevations under 6000 feet and the landscape in which it resides differs in legislation.

Diet 
Mountain cottontail diet is primarily made up of sagebrush and varies toward grasses during the spring and summer seasons. It is made up in large part of grasses such as wheatgrasses, needle-and-thread, Indian ricegrass, cheatgrass brome, bluegrasses, and bottlebrush squirreltail. Dependent on the area the diet may include quantities of shrubs such as Big sagebrush, rabbitbrush, and saltbushes. Juniper is also a common food source for the mountain cottontail. As food sources becomes more limited in the winter months the diet may turn to more woody plant parts such as bark and twigs.

Reproduction 
The nest of S. nuttallii is reported to be a cup-like cavity lined with fur and dried grass. The top of the nest is covered with fur, grass, and small sticks, probably placed there by the female. The average fetal sex ratio in Oregon was 1 male to 1.05 females; the adult sex ratio was 1 male to 1.18 females. Depending on location, the breeding season will vary but ranges during the spring and summer seasons, through February to July, and possibly later in warmer climates. The mountain cottontail is extremely reproductive and they reproduce around of 2-5 litters per year. Mean litter sizes average 4–6 kits per litter. In California and Nevada, the average litter size is around 6.1, 4.7 for rabbits in Washington and Oregon, and 2.0 for those in British Columbia. The gestation period for this cottontail is 28–30 days, and the female may be bred during postpartum estrous.

Behavior 
Lagomorphs produce two types of fecal pellets, dry and moist. The dry ones are the typical rabbit poop you see around, while the moist ones are typically eaten by the animal (coprophagy or hindgut fermentation). These moist pellets contain large amounts of nutrients that were passed out of the body the first time, and if they are not re-ingested those nutrients will be lost. They are not a social species and spend the largest quantity of time performing non-social behavior, but congregations occur on popular feeding grounds. Majority of feeding occurs at dusk and dawn in clearings near cover or in brush. The Mountain Cotton tail is also known to climb juniper trees to feed or drink water. Over 50% of the time the Mountain cottontail is active, it is feeding. The most common social behavior seen is during reproductive actions or courting. Although these Lagomorphs are not territorial the males typically have a larger home range than females.

The rabbits remain active all year. When spooked a rabbit will run a couple meters then hide and freeze with ears erect, if further pursued the rabbit will hop away in a semicircular path to try and trick the predator. The only behavior to reduce predation is limiting active time to dusk and dawn, and  the semicircular path they hop when chased. Predators include coyotes, bobcats, lynxes, martens, crows, ravens, hawks, owls, and rattlesnakes.

References

External links

Sylvilagus
Mammals of the United States
Mammals of Canada
Fauna of the Western United States
Fauna of the Great Basin
Fauna of the Rocky Mountains
Least concern biota of the United States
Mammals described in 1837
Taxonomy articles created by Polbot
Taxa named by John Bachman